Nadine Opgen-Rhein (born 1976) is a German sprint canoer who competed in the early to mid-2000s. She won five medals at the ICF Canoe Sprint World Championships with a gold (K-2 1000 m: 2001 and four silvers (K-2 1000 m: 2002, 2003, 2005; K-4 500 m: 2001).

References

German female canoeists
Living people
1976 births
ICF Canoe Sprint World Championships medalists in kayak